Tak Chun "Paul" Poon (traditional Chinese: 潘德俊) is a racing driver from Hong Kong, China. He is the current Hong Kong Touring Car Championship champion. He drives a Honda Civic EP3 for China Dragon Racing.

Career
Paul Poon is also the winner of the two previous editions of the CTM Cup (also known as Macau Cup) in 2006 and 2007, a race organized for the leading Asian touring car drivers.

In 2003, Paul Poon entered the international Macau Guia race for Super Production cars, using a car built by Mardi Gras Motorsport in the United Kingdom, as the Hong Kong Touring Car Championship winner. He finished 7th, the highest finishing position for a Hong Kong driver in that race.

In 2004, Paul Poon entered the Macau Guia race again. He did not finish in either Race 1 or 2.

For 2005, Paul Poon hired a BMW 320i to take part in the World Touring Car Championship finale in Macau, but he failed to qualify for the race.

In both 2006 and 2007, Paul went back to race in the Super Production class. He won the CTM Macau Cup with China Dragon Racing both times. In 2006 he won the race by just 0.003 second from arch rival Kenneth Look. In 2007 he just managed to fend off the charging Masaki Kano's BMW 320i, winning by 0.198 second.

In 2008, Paul attempted to complete a hat-trick of CTM Macau Cup victories, after winning the Hong Kong Touring Car Championship again. But he failed to win.

In 2012, Paul Poon led a China Dragon Racing 1-2 in qualifying for the CTM Macau Touring Car Cup, leading team-mate and 2011 race winner Samson Fung in the qualifying session. He then won the 2012 CTM Macau Touring Car Cup race, fighting off the advances of Team Pro Spec driver Andy Yan.

Asian GT Masters and Macau GT Cup

In 2009, he joined PaSa Racing to race a Ferrari 430 GT3 in the Asian GT Masters series and the Macau GT Cup.

Racing record

Complete World Touring Car Championship results
(key) (Races in bold indicate pole position) (Races in italics indicate fastest lap)

TCR Spa 500 results

References

1971 births
Living people
Hong Kong racing drivers
World Touring Car Championship drivers
24H Series drivers
Engstler Motorsport drivers